Wang Meiyin (Chinese: 王美银; born 26 December 1988) is a Chinese cyclist, who currently rides for UCI Continental team .

Major results

2010
 8th Tour of South China Sea
 9th Tour of Taihu Lake
2011
 4th Overall Tour of Hainan
2012
 1st Mountains classification, Tour of Hainan
 National Road Championships
2nd Road race
3rd Time trial
2013
 1st Mountains classification, Tour of China II
 5th Overall Tour de Langkawi
1st  Mountains classification
1st Stage 3
 7th Overall Tour of China I
2014
 5th Overall Tour of Taihu Lake
1st  Chinese rider classification
 6th Overall Tour of China II
1st  Chinese rider classification
 8th Overall Tour of Hainan
 10th Tour of Yancheng Coastal Wetlands
2015
 3rd Road race, National Road Championships
 6th Overall Tour of China I
1st Stage 5
 9th Overall Tour of Thailand
2016
 1st  Mountains classification, Tour de Langkawi
 4th Overall Tour of China I
 5th Overall Tour of Taihu Lake
 5th Overall Tour of China II
2017
 Asian Road Championships
4th Time trial
6th Road race
2018
 Asian Road Championships
6th Road race
7th Time trial
2020
 1st  Road race, National Road Championships

References

External links

1988 births
Living people
Chinese male cyclists
Cyclists at the 2014 Asian Games
Cyclists from Shandong
Asian Games competitors for China
21st-century Chinese people